Mandal Parishad Primary School or Mandal Parishad Upper Primary School is the name of many Government Primary Schools in India and most particularly in the states of Andhra Pradesh and Telangana. These schools are established, supervised, and funded by the Mandal Parishad (taluka level local authorities of states).Mandal Parishad Primary Schools provide education for students from grades 1–5.

References

See also
 Zilla Parishad High School
 Sarva Shiksha Abhiyan

Schools in Andhra Pradesh
Schools in Telangana
Primary schools in India
1927 establishments in India